Palmar may refer to:

Anatomy, relating to the palm of the hand

 Palmar aponeurosis, deep fascia connecting and within the muscles of the palm
 Palmar arches (disambiguation), various combinations of arteries in the hand and arm
 Palmar arteries (disambiguation), several sets of arteries in the hand
 Palmar branch of the median nerve, a branch of the median nerve that arises at the lower part of the forearm.
 Palmar branch of ulnar nerve, continuation of one branch of the ulnar nerve into the hand
 Palmar carpal branch:
 Palmar carpal branch of radial artery, a small blood vessel that crosses the wrist bones to join with the palmar branch of the ulnar artery
 Palmar carpal branch of ulnar artery, a small blood vessel that crosses the wrist bones to join with the palmar branch of the radial artery
 Palmar carpal ligament, the thickened portion of the deep forearm fascia on the front of the wrist
 Palmar crease, a crease in the surface of the palm
 Palmar digital nerves (disambiguation), several sets of nerves in the fingers
 Palmar digital veins, blood vessels on the palm side of the fingers
 Palmar erythema, reddening of the palms
 Palmar grasp reflex, a primitive reflex seen in newborns
 Palmar radioulnar ligament, a narrow band of fibers in the wrist joining the ends of the arm bones

Places

 Palmar, Santander, a municipality in the Santander Department, Colombia
 Palmar, Uruguay, a town in Soriano Department, Uruguay
 Palmar, Aguadilla, Puerto Rico, a rural barrio in the municipality of Aguadilla, Puerto Rico
 Palmar Arriba, a town in the Santiago province of the Dominican Republic
 Palmar de Bravo, a town and municipality in the Mexican state of Puebla
 Palmar de Ocoa, a town in the Azua province of the Dominican Republic
 Palmar de Varela, a municipality and town in the Colombian department of Atlántico
 Palmar Norte (North Palmar), a town in the Osa region, Puntarenas province, Costa Rica
 Palmar River, a river of Venezuela
 Palmar Sur (South Palmar), a town in the Osa region, Puntarenas province, Costa Rica
 El Palmar de Troya, a small village near Utrera, in Andalusia, Spain
 San Jose Palmar, a village in Orange Walk District, Belize

People
Wally Palmar (born Volodymyr Palamarchuk; 1954), American musician, singer, songwriter and composer

Other uses
 Palmar (football club), a football club in São Tomé and Príncipe
 Palmar de Junco, a sports venue in the neighborhood of Pueblo Nuevo, Matanzas, Cuba
 Our Lady of Palmar, Marian apparition
 Palmarian Catholic Church, Independent Catholic denomination
 Cathedral-Basilica of Our Crowned Mother of Palmar, Palmarian Catholic cathedral

See also 
 Palma (disambiguation)
 Palmares (disambiguation)
 Palmer (disambiguation)
 Volar (disambiguation), an anatomical term sometimes used as a synonym